The 2015 Masters Grand Slam of Curling was held from October 27 to November 1 at the Rath Eastlink Community Centre in Truro, Nova Scotia. This was the second Grand Slam Grand Slam of the 2015–16 curling season.

Men

Teams

Round-robin standings
Final round-robin standings

Round-robin results
All draw times are listed in Atlantic Daylight Time (UTC−3).

Draw 1
Tuesday, October 27, 7:00 pm

Draw 2
Wednesday, October 28, 8:30 am

Draw 3
Wednesday, October 28, 12:00 pm

Draw 4
Wednesday, October 28, 3:30 pm

Draw 5
Wednesday, October 28, 7:00 pm

Draw 6
Thursday, October 29, 8:30 am

Draw 7
Thursday, October 29, 12:00 pm

Draw 8
Thursday, October 29, 3:30 pm

Draw 9
Thursday, October 29, 7:00 pm

Draw 10
Friday, October 30, 8:30 am

Draw 11
Friday, October 30, 12:00 pm

Draw 12
Friday, October 30, 3:30 pm

Tiebreaker
Saturday, October 31, 9:00 am

Playoffs

Quarterfinals
Saturday, October 31, 1:00 pm

Semifinals
Sunday, November 1, 9:00 am

Final
Sunday, November 1, 1:00 pm

Women

Teams

Round-robin standings
Final round-robin standings

Round-robin results
All draw times are listed in Atlantic Daylight Time (UTC−3).

Draw 1
Tuesday, October 27, 7:00 pm

Draw 2
Wednesday, October 28, 8:30 am

Draw 3
Wednesday, October 28, 12:00 pm

Draw 4
Wednesday, October 28, 3:30 pm

Draw 5
Wednesday, October 28, 7:00 pm

Draw 6
Thursday, October 29, 8:30 am

Draw 7
Thursday, October 29, 12:00 pm

Draw 8
Thursday, October 29, 3:30 pm

Draw 9
Thursday, October 29, 7:00 pm

Draw 10
Friday, October 30, 8:30 am

Draw 11
Friday, October 30, 12:00 pm

Draw 13
Friday, October 30, 7:30 pm

Tiebreaker
Saturday, October 31, 9:00 am

Playoffs

Quarterfinals
Saturday, October 31, 6:00 pm

Semifinals
Sunday, November 1, 9:00 am

Final
Sunday, November 1, 6:00 pm

References

External links

2015 in Canadian curling
Truro, Nova Scotia
Curling in Nova Scotia
2015 in Nova Scotia
Masters (curling)